Tamburini is an Italian surname. Notable people with the surname include:

 Adrian Tamburini, Australian bass-baritone singer with Zelman Symphony
 Antonio Tamburini (baritone) (1800–1876), Italian operatic baritone
 Antonio Tamburini (racing driver) (born 1966), Italian racing driver
 Arnaldo Tamburini (1843-1901), Italian painter
 Arnaldo Casella Tamburini (1885-1936), Italian artist
 Francesco Tamburini (1846–1891), Italian-Argentine architect 
 Giovanni Maria Tamburini (flourished 1600s), Italian painter
 Juri Tamburini (born 1977), Italian footballer
 Luciana Tamburini (1952-2006), Italian actress and television hostess
 Massimo Tamburini (1943–2014), Italian motorcycle designer
 Michelangelo Tamburini (1648–1730), Italian Jesuit
 Pietro Paolo Tamburini  (1594-1621), Italian painter
 Roberto Tamburini (born 1991), Italian Grand Prix motorcycle road racer
 Stefano Tamburini (1955–1986), Italian graphic artist, author and publisher
 Tommaso Tamburini (1591–1675), Italian theologian
 Tullio Tamburini (1892–1957), Italian soldier, adventurer and Fascist official

Italian-language surnames